Robinsonville may refer to:
 Robinsonville, New Brunswick, Canada
 Robinsonville, Mississippi, United States
 Robinsonville, Oregon, United States
 Robinsonville, Wisconsin, United States